The 2016 Murray State Racers football team represented Murray State University in the 2016 NCAA Division I FCS football season. They were led by second-year head coach Mitch Stewart and played their home games at Roy Stewart Stadium. They were members of the Ohio Valley Conference. They finished the season 4–7, 4–4 in OVC play to finish in a tie for fifth place.

Schedule

Source: Schedule

Game summaries

at Illinois

Missouri State

at Southern Illinois

Southeast Missouri State

at Austin Peay

Tennessee–Martin

at Eastern Illinois

Tennessee State

at Eastern Kentucky

Jacksonville State

at Tennessee Tech

References

Murray State
Murray State Racers football seasons
Murray State Racers football